Anfal Nayef Hammad Al-Sufy (born 	14 October 1995) is a Jordanian footballer who plays as a defender for the Jordan women's national team.

International goals

References 

1995 births
Living people
Jordanian women's footballers
Jordan women's international footballers
Women's association football defenders
Sportspeople from Amman
Jordanian Muslims
Footballers at the 2014 Asian Games
Asian Games competitors for Jordan